Ontari is a 2008 Indian Telugu-language psychological action drama film produced by Pokuri Babu Rao on Ee Taram Films banner, directed by B.V. Ramana. Starring Gopichand, Bhavana  and music composed by Mani Sharma. The film was released theatrically on 14 February 2008.Its a loose adatation of 2004 British Film Dead Mans Shoes. 

It received mixed reviews from critics, with praise for the performance of Gopichand, humour, and editing, but criticized weak screenplay, and Ramana's direction.

The film has been dubbed into Tamil as Subramaniam and in Hindi as Ek Aur Khal Nayak. The film was remade twice in Dhallywood as Boss Number One and Premik Number One with Shakib Khan.

Plot
Vamsi (Gopichand) is the son of an affluent handloom house owner named Muddu Krishna Rao (Paruchuri Venkateswara Rao). He happens to fall in love with a girl named Bujji (Bhavana), who is an orphan and stays in a hostel. With his parents' consent, Vamsi tries to get engaged with Bujji, but she was kidnapped by a group of gangsters. Bujji is attempted to molest by Lal Mahankali's (Ashish Vidyarthi) younger brother Panda (Ajay), who is roughed up by Vamsi. Mahankali vows to take revenge on the day of Vamsi's marriage with Bujji, so he kidnaps and rapes Bujji in front of Vamsi. All this mishap happens because of MLA Raghava's (Rajiv Kanakala) support. Raghava is a close friend of Vamsi. He is promised with minister berth by Mahankali and stabs Vamsi. Vamsi arrives in Hyderabad and tries to trace the gangsters. Because of Raghava's betrayal, Vamsi kills him. Later, the ACP (Sayaji Shinde) interviews Vamsi's parents and family members because Vamsi is in a state of hallucination and he did not know until he told him. The ACP investigates the case, though at the end, he catches Vamsi but releases him and gives him support for killing the gangsters. Vamsi then kills Mahankali and rips Panda's arm off. At the end, Krishna Rao tells Vamsi that Bujji died the day of the engagement because she fell from a rock building.

Cast

Gopichand as Vamsi 
Bhavana as Kanaka Mahalakshmi "Bujji"
Ashish Vidyarthi as Lal Mahankali 
Ajay as Panda, Lal Mahankali's younger brother
Sayaji Shinde as ACP
Paruchuri Venkateswara Rao as Muddu Krishnaiah
Supreeth as Veeraju
Sunil as Subbu 
Ali as ATM
Naresh as Vamsi's elder brother
Rajiv Kanakala as Raghava
Narra Venkateswara Rao as Minister
Raghu Babu as Lal Mahankali's henchman
Indu Anand as Vamsi's mother
Chitti as Vamsi's second brother
Rajitha as Vamsi's elder sister-in-law
Sujatha Reddy as Vamsi's second sister-in-law
Prasanna Kumar as S.I.
Revathi
Baby Nishptha

Soundtrack

Music composed by Mani Sharma. Music released on Aditya Music.

Dhallywood Remakes
The film was remade twice in Dhallywood as Boss Number One and Premik Number One with Shakib Khan.

Others
 VCDs & DVDs on - VOLGA Videos, Hyderabad

References

External links 
 

2008 films
2000s Telugu-language films
Telugu films remade in other languages
Films scored by Mani Sharma
Indian films about revenge
2008 action drama films
Indian action drama films